Oasis is a meteorite crater in Libya. The crater is exposed at the surface, and has been significantly eroded. The prominent topographic ring is only the central uplift, which is about 5.2 km (~3 miles) in diameter, while the original crater rim is estimated to have been 18 km (~11 miles) in diameter. The age is estimated to be less than 120 million years (Lower Cretaceous).

References

External links 
Anonymous (nd) Africa (Impact Craters), Earth Impact Database, Planetary and Space Science Centre , University of New Brunswick, New Brunswick, Canada.

Impact craters of Libya
Cretaceous impact craters